"No Money" is a song by Swedish electronic music duo Galantis. It was released on 31 March 2016 as the lead single from their second studio album, The Aviary (2017). The song features uncredited vocals from Reece Bullimore, son of Beatbullyz's Andrew Bullimore and is written by Digital Farm Animals and Andrew Bullimore. It samples the amen break, most prominently at 1:44. It was commercially successful, peaking at number one in Norway and reaching the top ten in Sweden, the United Kingdom, Ireland, Australia, Austria, the Netherlands and Denmark. Additionally, it became their first single to chart on the US Billboard Hot 100 in the United States, peaking at number 88.

Music video 
The video starts with a young girl sewing a picture of the Galantis' Seafox in a jacket while humming the song. She paints her nose and wears the jacket and leaves the house through the window with her face painted like an animal. Other children walk with their face painted to an abandoned building. The girl then slowly makes her way to the building, while  more children with their face painted join her. The girl then enters the building and confronts another girl with her face painted. The two then have a dance-off, with the first girl winning while the other falls and disappears. As of the 21st of August, 2022, the video has over 621 million views on YouTube. The video features product placement by Converse All-Star shoes.

Track listing

Charts

Weekly charts

Year-end charts

Certifications

References 

2016 singles
2016 songs
Warner Music Group singles
Number-one singles in Norway
Galantis songs
Songs written by Digital Farm Animals
Songs written by Christian Karlsson (DJ)
Songs written by Henrik Jonback
Songs written by Style of Eye
Songs written by Svidden
Song recordings produced by Digital Farm Animals
Songs written by Andrew Bullimore
Progressive house songs